Bronchocela cristatella, also known as the green crested lizard, is a species of agamid lizard endemic to Southeast Asia.

Geographic range

B. cristatella is found in Malaysia (West Malaysia and Borneo), Singapore, Indonesia, Philippines (Palawan, Calamian Islands, Panay, Luzon), South Thailand, south Myanmar (Tenasserim Hills), and India (Nicobar Islands).

Description

This species is a bright green lizard, sometimes possessing a blue tint on the head. It is able to change colour, turning darker brown when threatened. There is a dark ring around each eye, and a dark spot at the back of the head. The males have a crest on the neck.
It has a very long and thin tail (75% of total length).

From C.A.L. Günther (1864) The Reptiles of British India. 
Scales of the sides small, there being about forty in one of the transverse scries; ventral scales much larger, in fourteen longitudinal rows. A short scries of three or four larger scales forms a continuation of the superciliary margin; no other large scale on the temple. Nuchal crest low, formed by triangular spines; it is not continued on the back, where the vertebral scales arc scarcely prominent. The fourth hind toe is one-eighth longer than the third. Uniform grass-green.
This species is very common in the Malayan countries and in numerous islands of the East Indian Archipelago—Sumatra, Java, Amboyna, Celebes, Borneo, Booroo, Philippines, &c. It moves and leaps with great quickness among the branches of trees. Cantor saw the colours of these lizards change suddenly to grey, brownish or blackish, sometimes with orange spots or with indistinct black network; large, isolated, round black spots appeared on the head or back or round the tympanum. It attains to a length of 20 inches, the tail measuring 16 inches.

Habitat
B. cristatella is found in forests as well as parks and rural areas.

Conservation status
In Singapore the range of B. cristatella is declining, as it is in competition with the introduced species Calotes versicolor (changeable lizard).

References

 Das I, Gemel R. 2000.  Nomenclatural status of Fitzinger's (1861) Pseudocalotes archiducissae, and confirmation of Bronchocela cristatella (Kuhl, 1820) from the Nicobar Archipelago (Squamata: Sauria: Agamidae).  Herpetozoa 13 (1/2): 55-58.
Ecology Asia page with photos

Further reading
Boulenger GA. 1885. Catalogue of the Lizards in the British Museum (Natural History). Second Edition. Volume I. ... Agamidæ. London: Trustees of the British Museum (Natural History). (Taylor and Francis, printers). xii + 436 pp. + Plates I-XXXII. (Calotes cristatellus, pp. 316–317).
Das I. 2002. A Photographic Guide to Snakes and Other Reptiles of India. Sanibel Island, Florida: Ralph Curtis Books. 144 pp. . (Bronchocela cristatella, p. 70).
Das I. 2006. A Photographic Guide to Snakes and Other Reptiles of Borneo. Sanibel Island, Florida: Ralph Curtis Books. 144 pp. . (Bronchocela cristatella, p. 76).
Günther ACLG. 1864. The Reptiles of British India. London: The Ray Society. (Taylor and Francis, printers). xxvii + 452 pp. + Plates I-XXVI. (Bronchcela cristatella, p. 138).
Kuhl H. 1820. Beiträge zur Zoologie und vergleichenden Anatomie. Frankfurt am Main: Hermannschen. 152 pp. (Agama cristatella, new species, p. 108). (in German and Latin).

External links
 
Photos from Nicobar and Andaman Islands

Bronchocela
Reptiles of Myanmar
Reptiles of India
Reptiles of Indonesia
Reptiles of Malaysia
Reptiles of the Philippines
Reptiles of Singapore
Reptiles of Thailand
Fauna of the Andaman and Nicobar Islands
Reptiles of Borneo
Reptiles described in 1820
Taxa named by Heinrich Kuhl